Written and illustrated by Reiji Miyajima, the manga series Rent-A-Girlfriend began serialization in Kodansha's Weekly Shōnen Magazine on July 12, 2017, and has been compiled into thirty volumes as of February 2023. The series is licensed in North America by Kodansha USA, which released the first volume in English on June 2, 2020. Kodansha published an anthology of the series on August 17, 2020.

A spin-off manga series, titled , also written and illustrated by Miyajima, has been serialized in Kodansha's Magazine Pocket app since June 21, 2020. The series focuses on the character Sumi Sakurasawa. It has been compiled into three volumes as of May 2022.  Individual chapters of the series are called ratings.



Volume list

Rent-A-Girlfriend

Chapters not yet published in volume format
These chapters have yet to be published in a tankōbon volume. They were originally serialized in Japanese in issues of Weekly Shōnen Magazine:

Rent-A-(Really Shy!)-Girlfriend

References

Rent-A-Girlfriend